Hyotissa is a genus of large saltwater oysters, marine bivalve mollusks in the family Gryphaeidae.

Species in this genus are known as honeycomb oysters, or "foam oysters" because under magnification, their shell structure is foam-like.

Species
Hyotissa haitensis (Sowerby, 1850)
Hyotissa hyotis (Linnaeus, 1758) - Giant honeycomb oyster
Hyotissa inermis (G. B. Sowerby II, 1871)
Hyotissa mcgintyi (Harry, 1985)
Hyotissa numisma (Lamarck, 1819)
Hyotissa quercina (G. B. Sowerby II, 1871)
Hyotissa sinensis (Gmelin, 1791)
Hyotissa semiplana  (de Sowerby 1825) 
Species brought into synonymy
 Hyotissa chemnitzii (Hanley, 1846): synonym of Dendostrea rosacea (Deshayes, 1836)
 Hyotissa quercina (G. B. Sowerby II, 1871): synonym of Hyotissa quercinus (G. B. Sowerby II, 1871) (incorrect spelling of specific epithet (quercinus is a noun in apposition))
 Hyotissa thomasi (McLean, 1941): synonym of Hyotissa mcgintyi (Harry, 1985)

References

 Stenzel H.B. (1971). Oysters. In, Moore, R.C. (Ed.), Treatise on Invertebrate Paleontology, pt. N, vol. 3, Mollusca 6, Bivalvia. Geological Society of America and University of Kansas Press, Lawrence. 3(6): 953–1224
 Coan, E. V.; Valentich-Scott, P. (2012). Bivalve seashells of tropical West America. Marine bivalve mollusks from Baja California to northern Peru. 2 vols, 1258 pp.
The original paper about the discovery of Hyotissa hyotis in the Florida Keys
 Paula M. Mikkelsen and Rudiger Bieler, 2008, Seashells of Southern Florida: Living Marine mollusks of the Florida Keys and adjacent regions, Princeton University Press, Princeton and Oxford,  
 
 
 Universal Biological Indexer

Gryphaeidae
Bivalve genera